Lin Yu-chang (born 10 March 1971) is a Taiwanese politician. He is the Interior Minister of Taiwan.

Early life
Lin did his bachelor's degree in landscape architecture from Chinese Culture University and master's degree in building and planning from National Taiwan University.

Mayor of Keelung City

2014 Keelung mayoral election
Lin was elected as the Mayor of Keelung City after winning the 2014 Keelung City mayoral election held on 29 November 2014.

2018 Keelung mayoral election

See also
 Mayor of Keelung

References

External links

 

|-

1971 births
Living people
Mayors of Keelung
Politicians of the Republic of China on Taiwan from Keelung
Democratic Progressive Party chairpersons